Abutilon  is a large genus of flowering plants in the mallow family, Malvaceae. It is distributed throughout the tropics and subtropics of the Americas, Africa, Asia, and Australia. General common names include Indian mallow and velvetleaf; ornamental varieties may be known as room maple, parlor maple, or flowering maple.
The genus name is an 18th-century New Latin word that came from the Arabic ,  the name given by Avicenna to this or a similar genus.

The type species is Abutilon theophrasti. Several species formerly placed in Abutilon, including the cultivated species and hybrids commonly known as "flowering maples", have recently (2012, 2014) been transferred to the new genus Callianthe.

Description
Plants of this genus include herbs, shrubs, and trees. They range in height from about 0.5 to 3 meters (1.5 to 10 feet). The herbage is generally hairy to woolly or bristly. The leaf blades are usually entire, but the occasional species has lobed leaves. They are palmately veined and have wavy or serrated edges. Flowers are solitary, paired, or borne in small inflorescences in the leaf axils or toward the branch tips. The calyx is bell-shaped with five lobes. The corolla is usually bell-shaped to wheel-shaped, with five petals joined at the bases.

The flowers of wild species are most often yellow or orange, but can be red or pinkish, sometimes with a darker center. The stamens are fused into a tube lined at the mouth with anthers. Inside the tube is the branching style with head-like stigmas. The fruit is a rounded or hemispherical schizocarp with up to 20 segments, each containing a few seeds.

Species
There are about 200 species in the genus.

Species include:
Abutilon abutiloides (Jacq.) Garcke – bushy abutilon, shrubby Indian mallow
Abutilon albescens Miq.
Abutilon asiaticum
Abutilon auritum (Wall. ex Link) Sweet – Asian Indian mallow
Abutilon avicennae - common yellow mallow
Abutilon bedfordianum (Hook.) A.St.-Hil. – Bedford's mallow
Abutilon berlandieri Gray ex S.Watson – Berlandier's Indian mallow
Abutilon bidentatum A.Rich.
Abutilon buchii Urb.
Abutilon darwinii Hook.f. – Darwin's mallow
Abutilon eremitopetalum Caum – hiddenpetal Indian mallow (Lānai in Hawaii)
Abutilon fruticosum Guill. & Perr. – Texas Indian mallow
Abutilon giganteum (Jacq.) Sweet
Abutilon grandiflorum G.Don
Abutilon grandifolium (Willd.) Sweet – hairy Indian mallow
Abutilon greveanum (Baill.) Hochr.
Abutilon guineense (Schumach.) Baker f. & Exell
Abutilon hirtum (Lam.) Sweet – Florida Keys Indian mallow
Abutilon hulseanum Torr. ex A.Gray
Abutilon hypoleucum A.Gray – whiteleaf Indian mallow
Abutilon incanum (Link) Sweet – hoary abutilon, pelotazo (Southwestern United States, northern Mexico, Hawaii)
Abutilon indicum (L.) Sweet – Indian abutilon, Indian lantern-flower, monkeybush
Abutilon insigne Planch.
Abutilon julianae Endl.
Abutilon lauraster Hochr.
Abutilon leonardi Urb. – woolly abutilon
Abutilon leucopetalum (F.Muell.) F.Muell. ex Benth. – desert Chinese-lantern
Abutilon listeri Baker f.
Abutilon longicuspe Hochst. ex A.Rich.
Abutilon malacum S. Watson – yellow Indian mallow
Abutilon mauritianum (Jacq.) Medik.
Abutilon megapotamicum A.St.-Hil. & Naudin – trailing abutilon
Abutilon menziesii Seem. – kooloaula (Hawaii)
Abutilon mollicomum (Willd.) Sweet – Sonoran Indian mallow
Abutilon mollissimum
Abutilon muticum
Abutilon niveum Griseb. – white-flowered abutilon
Abutilon oxycarpum – small-leaved abutilon
Abutilon palmeri A.Gray – Palmer's Indian mallow
Abutilon pannosum (G.Forst.) Schltdl.
Abutilon parishii A.Watson – Parish's Indian mallow
Abutilon parvulum A.Gray – dwarf Indian mallow
Abutilon pauciflorum A.St.-Hil. – woolly abutilon
Abutilon permolle (Willd.) Sweet – coastal Indian mallow
Abutilon pictum (Gillies ex Hook.) Walp. – redvein abutilon, painted Indian mallow (syn. A. striatum)
Abutilon pitcairnense Fosberg
Abutilon purpurascens (Link) K.Schum.
Abutilon reflexum (Juss. ex Cav.) Sweet
Abutilon ramiflorum A.St.-Hil.
Abutilon ranadei  Woodr.et.Stapf- Indian son ghanta
Abutilon reventum S.Watson – yellowflower Indian mallow
Abutilon sachetianum Fosberg
Abutilon sandwicense (O.Deg.) Christoph. – greenflower Indian mallow (Oahu in Hawaii)
Abutilon sellowianum (Klotzsch) Regel
Abutilon theophrasti Medik. – butterprint, abutilon-hemp, China-jute, velvetleaf (in USA), swamp Chinese-lantern
Abutilon thurberi A.Gray – Thurber's Indian mallow
Abutilon thyrsodendron Griseb.
Abutilon trisulcatum (Jacq.) Britton & Millsp. – anglestem Indian mallow
Abutilon venosum Lem.
Abutilon virginianum Krapov. – Virgin Islands abutilon
Abutilon wrightii A.Gray – Wright's Indian mallow

Hybrids
Abutilon × hybridum (unknown parentage)
Abutilon × milleri (A. megapotamicum × A. pictum)
Abutilon × suntense (A. ochsenii × A. vitifolium)

Formerly placed here
Bakeridesia integerrima (Hook.) D.M.Bates (as A. chittendenii Standl.)
Briquetia spicata (Kunth) Fryxell (as A. spicatum Kunth)
Corynabutilon ochsenii (Phil.) Kearney (as A. ochsenii (Phil.) Reiche)
Corynabutilon vitifolium (Cav.) Kearney (as A. vitifolium (Cav.) C.Presl)

Cultivation
Some abutilons are cultivated as garden plants. Several hybrids and cultivars have been developed.

Cultivars, hybrids, and species that have gained the Royal Horticultural Society's Award of Garden Merit include:

A. megapotamicum 
A. × milleri 
'Canary Bird'  
'Cannington Carol' 
'Cannington Peter'  
'Kentish Belle' 
'Linda Vista Peach' 
'Marion' 
'Nabob'  
'Orange Glow'  
'Savitzii' 
'Souvenir de Bonn' 
'Veronica Tennant'  

Abutilons can be propagated from seed or via cuttings. The best potting medium is a loose soil rich in organic material and sand and watered when dry to the touch. The amount of watering should be reduced from November to March and the plant pruned back one third at the end of this rest period. The plant is prone to attack by scale insects. The plant is best replaced every two to three years with new specimens.

Gallery

References

External links

 Abutilon Plant Info and Care

 
Malvaceae genera
Taxa named by Philip Miller
Taxa described in 1754